The 66th Academy Awards ceremony, organized by the Academy of Motion Picture Arts and Sciences (AMPAS), honored films released in 1993 and took place on March 21, 1994, at the Dorothy Chandler Pavilion in Los Angeles beginning at 6:00 p.m. PST / 9:00 p.m. EST. During the ceremony, AMPAS presented Academy Awards (commonly referred to as Oscars) in 23 categories. The ceremony, televised in the United States by ABC, was produced by Gil Cates and directed by Jeff Margolis. Actress Whoopi Goldberg hosted the show for the first time. Nearly a month earlier in a ceremony held at The Beverly Hilton in Beverly Hills, California on February 26, the Academy Awards for Technical Achievement were presented by host Laura Dern.

Schindler's List won seven awards, including Best Picture. Other winners included Jurassic Park and The Piano with three awards, Philadelphia with two, and The Age of Innocence, Belle Époque, Defending Our Lives, The Fugitive, I Am a Promise: The Children of Stanton Elementary School, Mrs. Doubtfire, Schwarzfahrer, and The Wrong Trousers with one. The telecast was watched by more than 46 million viewers in the United States.

Winners and nominees

The nominees for the 66th Academy Awards were announced on February 9, 1994, at the Samuel Goldwyn Theater in Beverly Hills, California, by Academy president Arthur Hiller, and actress Christine Lahti. Schindler's List led all nominees with twelve nominations; The Piano and The Remains of the Day tied for second with eight.

The winners were announced during the awards ceremony on March 21, 1994. Best Director nominee Jane Campion was the second woman to be nominated in that category. Holly Hunter and Emma Thompson's nominations in both lead and supporting acting categories marked the first and so far only occurrence that two performers earned double acting nominations in the same year. Best Supporting Actress winner Anna Paquin, at age 11, became the second youngest winner of a competitive acting Oscar, behind Tatum O'Neal, who won at age 10 for Paper Moon. 19-year old Leonardo DiCaprio became the seventh-youngest nominee in Best Supporting Actor category for his role as Arnie Grape in What's Eating Gilbert Grape.

Awards

Winners are listed first, highlighted in boldface, and indicated with a double-dagger.

Academy Honorary Award
 Deborah Kerr

Jean Hersholt Humanitarian Award
 Paul Newman

Films with multiple nominations and awards

The following 16 films had multiple nominations:

The following four films received multiple awards:

Presenters and performers
The following individuals, listed in order of appearance, presented awards or performed musical numbers:

Presenters

Performers

Ceremony information

Due to the negative reception received from the preceding year's ceremony, actor Billy Crystal announced that after overseeing four consecutive Oscar ceremonies, he would not be hosting the 1994 telecast. In a statement released by his publicist, he stated, "After three Grammys, four Oscars and six Comic Reliefs, I'm going to take a break from my hosting duties. I always felt honored to host the show and did my best to carry on the tradition of Bob Hope and Johnny Carson. I hope the new host has as good a time as I did." With Crystal absent to host the Oscars, many media outlets wondered whom producer Gil Cates would hire to emcee the program. Film columnist Jack Matthews suggested that actor Tom Hanks, who would eventually win Best Actor for Philadelphia, should host the show writing that he "has charm, dignity, wit, intelligence and, it's worth mentioning, he's a movie star!" Cates also offered the role to performers Steve Martin, Bette Midler, and Johnny Carson, but they all turned down the opportunity.

After several days of speculation, Cates announced that he hired Oscar-winning actress and comedian Whoopi Goldberg to host the festivities for the first time. By virtue of her selection, Goldberg became both the first African American to host as well as the first woman to host the telecast solo. In an interview with the Los Angeles Times, Cates explained the decision to hire her saying, "She is a highly recognizable star who has millions of fans." He also addressed the media's concerns regarding Goldberg's raunchy and outspoken humor stating, "Some people may think she's potentially dangerous, and she says things that come to her mind. It's going to be exciting for me. The main thing is she wants to do it and she's smart. Whatever she says will be appropriate." Goldberg expressed that she was thrilled to be selected to emcee the 1994 ceremony commenting, "To go from watching to winning to hosting in one lifetime is major."

As with previous ceremonies he produced, Cates centered the show around a theme. This year, he christened the show with the theme "People Behind the Camera" commenting that "It will be a salute to those unseen men and women who make what we see on the screen, the artist and craftspeople responsible for the magic of the movies." In tandem with the theme, the ceremony's opening number featured a montage produced by Chuck Workman saluting the many individuals such as directors, editors, and composers who are involved in moviemaking. During that segment, singer Bernadette Peters performing a modified version of Stephen Sondheim's song "Putting It Together" from his musical Sunday in the Park with George. Filmmaker and editor Carol A. Streit assembled another montage featuring a salute to the work of cinematographers and their contributions to film.

Several other people and elements were also involved with the production of the ceremony. Production designer Roy Christopher designed a new stage for the ceremony which prominently featured five giant Oscar statues each flanked inside metal cones that were illuminated recurrently throughout the show. Film composer and musician Bill Conti served as musical director of the ceremony. Dancer Debbie Allen choreographed a dancer number showcasing the Best Original Score nominees featuring eight prestigious ballet and dance troupes from around the world.

Box office performance of nominees
At the time of the nominations announcement on February 9, the combined gross of the five Best Picture nominees at the US box office was $261 million, with an average of $52.2 million per film. The Fugitive was the highest earner among the Best Picture nominees with $179 million in domestic box office receipts. The film was followed by Schindler's List ($29.6 million), The Piano ($25.7 million), The Remains of the Day ($19.5 million), and finally In the Name of the Father ($6.5 million).

Of the top 50 grossing movies of the year, 36 nominations went to 14 films on the list. Only The Fugitive (3rd), The Firm (4th), Sleepless in Seattle (6th), In the Line of Fire (7th), Dave (13th), Philadelphia (29th), What's Love Got to Do With It (38th), and The Age of Innocence (49th) were nominated for directing, acting, screenwriting, or Best Picture. The other top 50 box office hits that earned nominations were Jurassic Park (1st), Mrs. Doubtfire (2nd), Cliffhanger (9th), The Nightmare Before Christmas (24th), Addams Family Values (25th), and Beethoven's 2nd (27th).

Critical reviews
The show received a positive reception from most media publications. The New York Times film critic Janet Maslin raved that the telecast had "less silliness and less small talk, with more emphasis on cleverly chosen film clips and the bona fide Hollywood magic being celebrated." She also praised host Goldberg saying that she "sustained a tone of levity, which became particularly important as the sweep by Schindler's List threatened to bring out great ponderousness in some quarters." Pittsburgh Post-Gazette television critic Robert Bianco commended Goldberg's performance writing that "She never acted like she was too smart or to hip for the show she was hosting; she never smirked like there was a joke she alone was cool enough to get." He also extolled producer Cates by commenting, "In place of the extraneous jokes and terrible production numbers, he gave us a theme that worked and a generous selection of clips to back it up." Anne Thompson of Entertainment Weekly lauded Goldberg by stating, "Her elegant appearance (at least during the first half), her uncharacteristic restraint (she didn't cuss), and her ability to make it funny (despite the very somber speeches) made the ho-hum telecast worth watching."

Some media outlets were more critical of the show. Television critic Howard Rosenberg of the Los Angeles Times lamented that Goldberg's humor "wilted in a blessedly brief 3-hour-and-18-minute telecast." He also wrote that compared with Billy Crystal, her hosting skills were "balmy". Orlando Sentinel film critic Jay Boyar bemoaned that "this year's Oscarcast was only a little more exciting than a wine snob droning on about his favorite vintages." Harold Schindler of The Salt Lake City Tribune remarked that Whoopi's preference for "insider" jokes "left the audience murmuring and most viewers probably scratching their heads." He also added the biggest letdown of the telecast was "Goldberg's seeming ineptness at understanding the moment"

Ratings and reception
The American telecast on ABC drew in an average of 46.26 million people over its length, which was a 1% increase from the previous year's ceremony. However, the show drew lower Nielsen ratings compared to the previous ceremony with 31.86% of households watching over a 49.28 share. It also drew a lower 18–49 demographic rating with a 19.73 rating over a 40.53 share among viewers in that demographic.

In July 1994, the ceremony presentation received seven nominations at the 46th Primetime Emmys. Two months later, the ceremony won one of those nominations for Outstanding Technical Direction/Camera/Video for a Miniseries or Special (Averill Perry, Jim Ralston, Kenneth R. Shapiro, Bill Pope, Hector Ramirez, Larry Heider, Dave Levisohn, Blair White, Bill Philben, Ralph Alcocer, Larry Stenman, Bud Holland, David Irete, Tom Geren, Dale Carlson, David Plakos, Ted Ashton, Jeff Mydoc, Chuck Pharis, Jean M. Mason).

In Memoriam
The annual In Memoriam tribute was presented by actress Glenn Close. The montage featured an excerpt of the main title of Terms of Endearment composed by Michael Gore.

 Lillian Gish
 Myrna Loy
 Joseph Cotten
 Spanky McFarland
 Ruby Keeler
 Telly Savalas
 Melina Mercouri
 Cesar Romero
 Ted Haworth – Production Designer
 Vincent Price
 Stewart Granger
 Samuel Bronston – Producer
 River Phoenix
 Raymond Burr
 Cantinflas
 Alexis Smith
 Joseph L. Mankiewicz – Writer/Director
 Irene Sharaff – Costume Designer
 Helen Hayes
 John Candy
 Sammy Cahn – Songwriter
 Ray Sharkey
 Federico Fellini – Writer/Director
 Hervé Villechaize
 Don Ameche
 Audrey Hepburn
 Brandon Lee
 Dinah Shore
 Fred Gwynne
 Vincent Gardenia

See also

 14th Golden Raspberry Awards
 36th Grammy Awards
 46th Primetime Emmy Awards
 47th British Academy Film Awards
 48th Tony Awards
 51st Golden Globe Awards
 List of submissions to the 66th Academy Awards for Best Foreign Language Film

References

Bibliography

External links
Official websites
 Academy Awards Official website
 The Academy of Motion Picture Arts and Sciences Official website
 Oscar's Channel at YouTube (run by the Academy of Motion Picture Arts and Sciences)

Analysis
 1993 Academy Awards Winners and History Filmsite
 Academy Awards, USA: 1994 Internet Movie Database

Other resources
 

Academy Awards ceremonies
1993 film awards
1994 in Los Angeles
1994 in American cinema
March 1994 events in the United States
Academy
Television shows directed by Jeff Margolis